Phillpotts is a surname. Notable people with the surname include:
 Adelaide Phillpotts (1896–1993), English novelist, poet and playwright
 Ambrosine Phillpotts (1912–1980), British actress
 Bertha Phillpotts (1877–1932), English scholar
 Brian Surtees Phillpotts (1875–1917), officer of the Royal Engineers
 Eden Phillpotts (1862–1960), English author, poet,
 George Phillpotts (1814–1845), New Zealand naval officer
 Henry Phillpotts (1778–1869), Anglican Bishop of Exeter from 1830 to 1869
 James Surtees Phillpotts (1839–1930), author and editor, and headmaster of Bedford School
 John Phillpotts (MP) (1775–1849), nineteenth-century English politician
 Laurent Phillpotts (1922–2016), joined the RAF in 1943
 Louis Murray Phillpotts (1870–1916), senior British Army officer
 William Phillpotts (1807–1888), Archdeacon of Cornwall

See also
 Phillpott (disambiguation)
 Philpott (disambiguation)
 Philpot (disambiguation)
 Philpots